The Beaumont Cup was a Trinidadian first-class cricket competition which regional sides competed for, the matches taking place over three days.

History 
The competition began in 1925–26, when Rolland Beaumont, the South African Test player who had moved to Trinidad and become manager of an oil company, donated the cup to be played for by North Trinidad and South Trinidad. Beginning with the 1958–59 season the annual match was granted first-class status. In 1970–71 East Trinidad and Central Trinidad joined the competition, which now had two preliminary matches and a final. 

In 1971–72 the competition was renamed the Texaco Cup. From 1975–76 to 1977–78 the competition was decided on a round robin format, with six matches each season. In 1978–79 Tobago joined the competition, and there were ten round-robin matches. That was the final season in which the Texaco Cup had first-class status.

In 1975–76 the Beaumont Cup was revived, to be contested by two teams again, in an annual match between South and Central Trinidad and North and East Trinidad. It had first-class status from 1975–76 to 1979–80, and from 1982–83 to 1984–85.

The Beaumont Cup was also held as a non-first-class contest between South and Central Trinidad and North and East Trinidad in 1980–81, 1981–82 and 1985–86. The non-first-class contest between the two teams continued under the names Trintoc Trophy (1986–87 to 1995–96) and Gerry Gomez Memorial Trophy (1996–97 to 2000–01).

Honour board

The tables below list the winners of the Beaumont Cup and Texaco Cup in the seasons in which the competition had first-class status.

Beaumont Cup 1958–59 to 1969–70

Contested by North Trinidad and South Trinidad. Winners held the Cup until they were defeated outright in a subsequent season.

Beaumont Cup 1970–71, Texaco Cup 1971–72 to 1978–79

Contested by North Trinidad, South Trinidad, Central Trinidad and East Trinidad. Tobago also competed in 1978–79.

Beaumont Cup 1975–76 to 1984–85

Contested by North and East Trinidad and South and Central Trinidad.

References

External links
Cricket Archive

Beaumont
First-class cricket competitions